The Executive Office for United States Attorneys (EOUSA) is the office within the Department of Justice that provides executive and administrative support for the 93 United States Attorneys located throughout the 50 states, District of Columbia, Guam, the Northern Mariana Islands, Puerto Rico, and the U.S. Virgin Islands. Such support includes, but is not limited to, legal education, administrative oversight, technical support, and the creation of uniform policies. The organization of the EOUSA is laid out in Title 3 of the Justice Manual., which is provided by the United States Department of Justice.

This article incorporates public domain material from websites or documents of the United States Department of Justice.

History 
The Executive Office for United States Attorneys was created on April 6, 1953 by Attorney General Order No. 8-53, issued by then-Attorney General Herbert Brownell, Jr. The office, created as a part of the Office of the Deputy Attorney General, was to provide for close liaison between the Department of Justice in Washington, DC and the 93 U.S. Attorneys (USAs) throughout the 50 states, the District of Columbia, Guam, the Northern Mariana Islands, Puerto Rico, and the U.S. Virgin Islands. It was organized by James R. Browning, who also served as the office’s first chief. Browning would later become a federal circuit judge on the U.S. Court of Appeals for the Ninth Circuit.

The Attorney General’s Advisory Committee of United States Attorneys (AGAC), was created on February 13, 1976 by then-Attorney General Elliot Richardson to advise the Attorney General and give U.S. Attorneys a say in Department of Justice policies. Members of the Committee are selected by the Attorney General to serve on a rotating basis.

Executive Office for United States Attorneys Director 
The EOUSA is under the direction of a director. The EOUSA director provides general executive assistance and supervision to all U.S. Attorney’s offices, including:

 Evaluating the performance of all U.S. Attorney offices, making appropriate reports and inspections, and taking corrective action when indicated.
 Coordinating and directing the relationship with the U.S. Attorney offices with other organizational units of the Department of Justice.
 Publishing and maintaining a U.S. Attorneys’ Manual and a United States Attorneys’ Bulletin for the internal guidance of the U.S. Attorneys’ offices and those other organizational units of the Department concerned with litigation.
 Supervising the operation of the Office of Legal Education, the Attorney General’s Advocacy Institute and the Legal Education Institute, which authorizes, develops, and conducts the training of all federal legal personnel.
 Providing the Attorney General’s Advisory Committee of United States Attorneys with such staff assistance and funds as are reasonably necessary to carry out the Committee’s responsibilities.
 Establishing policy and procedures for the satisfaction, collection, or recovery of criminal fines, special assessments, penalties, interest, bail bond forfeitures, restitution, and court costs in criminal cases consistent with 28 CFR 0.171 in the Code of Federal Regulations.

The current director of the EOUSA is Monty Wilkinson. He was re-appointed EOUSA Director on March 22, 2021.

Directors of the Executive Office for United States Attorneys

Responsibilities 
The Executive Office for United States Attorneys provides:

 Coordination between the United States Attorneys offices and other components of the Department of Justice and other federal agencies.
 General executive assistance and direction, including U.S. Attorney, Assistant U.S. Attorney and Special Assistant U.S. Attorney appointment support; direction and supervision of management and policy activities of U.S. Attorney financial litigation programs; general legal interpretation, opinion, and advice; budget and financial assistance; staff assistance and funds for committees such as the Attorney General’s Advisory Committee; and by serving as the liaison on Victim-Witness assistance activities done in U.S. Attorney offices.
 Policy development, including establishing and interpreting guidelines on criminal fine collection issues; providing information and guidance on important legislation, congressional oversight, and appropriations hearings; responding to inquiries from members of Congress and private citizens; and responding to requests under the Freedom of Information Act and the Privacy Act.
 Administration management and oversight, including providing support for programs in facilities management, support services, and security; evaluating U.S. Attorney performance; and publishing and maintaining a United States Justice Manual (previously known as the U.S. Attorney Manual, title formally changed in September 25, 2018) and United States Attorneys’ Bulletin for internal use.
 Operational support for all U.S. Attorney offices, including designing and providing automated services and systems for office administrative and case management purposes; providing technical, strategic communications, and video telecommunications support; and promoting and monitoring programs with the U.S. Attorney offices and the Department of Justice, as designated by the Attorney General.

The EOUSA also supervises the operation of the Office of Legal Education, which develops, conducts, and assists in the training of all Department of Justice legal personnel and other federal legal personnel.

Organization 
The Office of the EOUSA Director serves as the focal point for a wide array of requests and inquiries from the United States Attorneys offices. The EOUSA Director is responsible for the overall supervision and management of all EOUSA staff to help provide support, guidance, assistance, and management to the 93 United States Attorneys.

 Director
 Deputy Director and Counsel to the Director
 Legal and Victims Programs
 Data Integrity and Analysis
 Strategic Communications
 Evaluation and Review
 Resource Management and Planning
 Information Technology
 Human Resources
 Deputy Director
 General Counsel
Freedom of Information Act (FOIA)/ Privacy Act (PA)
Equal Employment Opportunity and Diversity Management
 Legal Education

References 

Federal government of the United States
 
1953 establishments in the United States